Jannik Borgmann (born 12 November 1997) is a German professional footballer who plays as a defender for Rot Weiss Ahlen.

References

External links
 Profile on FuPa.net

1997 births
Living people
German footballers
Association football defenders
SC Preußen Münster players
Rot Weiss Ahlen players
3. Liga players
Regionalliga players
Oberliga (football) players